Rzav may refer to:

Places
Rzav (Višegrad), a village in the municipality of Višegrad, Bosnia and Herzegovina

Rivers
 Rzav (Drina), or Zlatiborski Rzav, Veliki Rzav (Great Rzav), a river in western Serbia and eastern Bosnia and Hercegovina
 Beli Rzav, (White Rzav), a headstream of the Veliki Rzav
 Crni Rzav, (Black Rzav), a headstream of the Veliki Rzav
 Rzav (Golija), or Golijski Rzav, a river in western Serbia
 Mali Rzav, (Little Rzav), a headstream of the Golijski Rzav
 Veliki Rzav (Golijski), a headstream of the Golijski Rzav